Conus tacomae is a species of sea snail, a marine gastropod mollusk in the family Conidae, the cone snails and their allies.

Like all species within the genus Conus, these snails are predatory and venomous. They are capable of "stinging" humans, therefore live ones should be handled carefully or not at all.

Description
The size of the shell varies between 15 mm and 30 mm.

Distribution and habitat
This marine species is only known to occur at the coast of Senegal, off the island of Gorée, approx 2 km offshore from Dakar. It has been found on rocky coastlines at depths of 0–7 m, and also in sandy pockets at 35–40 m.

References

Further reading

External links
 The Conus Biodiversity website
 Cone Shells – Knights of the Sea
 
 Holotype in MNHN, Paris

tacomae
Gastropods described in 2009